Nathaniel Trives (born 1934/1935) is an American politician who served as the first African-American mayor of Santa Monica, California, a town then 95 percent white. Trives is a former Santa Monica police officer who served on the Santa Monica City Council from 1971 to 1979.

Biography
Trives was born in Alabama and moved to Richmond, Indiana in 1937 where he was the only Black child at his school. He then moved to Glendale, Ohio near Cincinnati and moved to Santa Monica in 1949. His father worked in commercial real estate. He is a graduate of Santa Monica High School. Trives received his B.S. in criminal justice from Cal State Los Angeles and Master of Public Administration from UCLA. He is an alumnus of Santa Monica College. After school, he served on the Santa Monica Police Department achieving the rank of sergeant and served as president of the Santa Monica Police Officers Association for five years. He was elected to the Santa Monica City Council in 1971 and re-elected in 1975. He served as mayor pro tem from 1973-1975 and mayor from 1975-77. While mayor, he diversified the administration adding minorities to every board and commission. In the late 1970s, he was named a special master and auditor monitor at the US Federal Court for the Northern District of California flying to San Francisco during the week.

Personal life
In 1955 he married Ida Trives at the First Baptist Church in Venice, California. they had one daughter, Toni.

External links
 Mr. Santa Monica

References

Mayors of Santa Monica, California
Santa Monica City Council members
African-American mayors in California
1930s births